Stephan Zwierschitz (born 17 September 1990) is an Austrian professional footballer who plays for Admira Wacker.

Club statistics

Updated to games played as of 16 June 2014.

References

External links

 
 
 Stephan Zwierschitz at ÖFB

1990 births
Living people
People from Mödling
Austrian footballers
Austria under-21 international footballers
Association football defenders
SKN St. Pölten players
FC Admira Wacker Mödling players
FK Austria Wien players
Austrian Football Bundesliga players
2. Liga (Austria) players
Footballers from Lower Austria